Nellikka is a 2015 Malayalam-language film written by P R Arun and directed by Bijith Bala. The film stars Deepak Parambol with Atul Kulkarni, Sashi Kumar, and Bhagath Manuel in supporting roles. The film is a musical family film. Prakash Marar, Santhosh Varma, and Rafeeq Ahmed wriote songs for the film.

Plot
The story revolves around Balu. Balu after the completion of his studies from North India returns home, jobless. He was warmly welcomed by his father Hari an M. S. Baburaj fan and by his sister Nandhana. Hari is an ardent fan of M. S. Baburaj while the son is a fan of Bob Marley. After his arrival he meets Nandu's fiancé Satheesh. They create an instant friendship to each other. Satheesh is a polished modern man working as a manager in Bank. He helped Balu to resolve the issue with his ex-girlfriend and their relationship bloomed again. Balu also heads an immature band. Everything was fine till Balu realises his brother in law's demeanor is not very real.

Cast
 Deepak as Balu
 Parveen as Nandhana
 Atul Kulkarni as Satheesh
 Sashi Kumar as Hari
 Sija Rose as Priya
 Bhagath Manuel
 Mammukkoya
 Koottickal Jayachandran
 Sunil Sukhada

Songs
There are seven songs in this movie. Four songs are written by Prakash Marar, two by Santhosh Varma and one song is by Rafeeq Ahamed. The music is composed by Bijibal and the BGM was also provided by him.

Songs list
 "Swapna CHirakil": Sachin Warrier
 "Unaroo": Sayanora Philip
 "Noorey Illahi": Berny, Krishna Bingane, Nila Madhab
 "Chirakurummi": Najim Arshad, Aparna Rajeev
 "Ravin Nizhaloram" : Remya Nambeesan
 "Maranamillatha" : Aslam Abdul Majeed

References

External links
 

2015 films
2010s Malayalam-language films
Films scored by Bijibal